Dhamnagar is a Vidhan Sabha constituency of Bhadrak district, Odisha.

This constituency includes Dhamnagar block and 12 GPs (Paliabindha, Achak, Dolasahi, Guamal, Talapada, Kubera, Biliana, Baro, Bodak, Kanpada, Shyamsundarpur and Talagopabindha) of Tihidi block.

In 2009 election, Biju Janata Dal candidate Rajendra Kumar Das defeated Bharatiya Janata Party candidate Bishnu Sethi by a margin of 4,944 votes.

In 2019 election, Bharatiya Janata Party candidate Bishnu Sethi defeated Biju Janata Dal candidate Rajendra Das by a margin of 4,625 votes.

Elected Members

Elected members from the Dhamnagar constituency are:

2022 (bypoll): Suryabanshi Suraj (BJP)
2019: Bishnu Sethi (BJP)
2014: Muktikanta Mandal (BJD)
2009: Rajendra Kumar Das (BJD)
2004: Manmohan Samal (BJP) 
2000: Manas Ranjan Mallik (Independent)
1995: Jagannath Rout (Congress)
1990: Hrudananda Mallik  (Janata Dal)
1985: Jagannath Rout (Congress)
1980: Jagannath Rout (Congress-I)
1977: Hrudananda Mallick (Janata Party)
1974: Hrudananda Mallick (Utkal Congress)
1971: Hrudananda Mallick (Utkal Congress)
1967: Satyabhama Dei (Orissa Jana Congress)
1961: Muralidhar Jena (Congress)
1957: Muralidhar Jena (Congress)
1951: Nilamoni Routra (Congress)

Election results

2022

2019 

In 2019 election, Bharatiya Janata Party candidate Bishnu Sethi defeated Biju Janata Dal candidate Rajendra Das by a margin of 4,625 votes.

2014 
In 2014 election, Biju Janata Dal candidate Muktikanta Mandal defeated Bharatiya Janata Party candidate Bishnu Charan Sethi by a margin of 9,192 votes.

2009

Notes

References

Assembly constituencies of Odisha
Bhadrak district